John F. Hubbard (February 15, 1795 – October 5, 1876) was an American newspaper editor and politician from New York.

Life
From 1816 on, he published the Norwich Journal. In February 1820, he married Almira Mead (1800-1878; daughter of Gen. Thompson Mead), and they had five children, among them State Senator John F. Hubbard Jr. (born 1822).

He was a member of the New York State Assembly (Chenango Co.) in 1824.

He was a member of the New York State Senate (2nd D.) from 1829 to 1836, sitting in the 52nd, 53rd, 54th, 55th, 56th, 57th, 58th and 59th New York State Legislatures.

He died on October 5, 1876, in Norwich, Chenango County, New York.

Sources
The New York Civil List compiled by Franklin Benjamin Hough (pages 128ff, 142, 200 and 282; Weed, Parsons and Co., 1858)
John F. Hubbard at Ancestry.com

1795 births
1876 deaths
People from Norwich, New York
New York (state) state senators
New York (state) Jacksonians
19th-century American politicians
Members of the New York State Assembly
19th-century American newspaper editors